Hoffmann's Stärkefabriken (English: Hoffman's Starch Factories) was a German company that produced starch and food chemicals. It was founded in 1850 and ceased operations in 1990.

It was the oldest industrial company in Bad Salzuflen, North Rhine-Westphalia-area of Germany.

See also 
 Starch mill

References

External links

 

Food and drink companies of Germany
Food and drink companies established in 1850
1850 establishments in Prussia
German companies established in 1850
Food and drink companies disestablished in 1990
German companies disestablished in 1990
Companies based in North Rhine-Westphalia
Starch companies
Lippe